Indirana brachytarsus is a species of frog found in the Western Ghats (including the Anaimalai Hills) of India. It is locally common terrestrial frog associated with hill streams in wet evergreen and semi-evergreen tropical forests and swamps. It may also be found at forest edges but does not penetrate further to agricultural land. It breeds on wet rocks, and the tadpoles are found on wet rock surfaces next to streams.

References

brachytarsus
Frogs of India
Endemic fauna of the Western Ghats
Amphibians described in 1876
Taxa named by Albert Günther